Paradiso is a Turin Metro station, located in the suburb named Borgata Paradiso, along Corso Francia near Via Podgora. It is the first station in Collegno territory. The station was opened on 4 February 2006 as part of the inaugural section of Turin Metro, between Fermi and XVIII Dicembre.

History
It was part of the first section of the line, opened in 2006. The platforms feature decals by Ugo Nespolo depicting distinctive items related to Turin industries.

Services
 Ticket vending machines
 Handicap accessibility
 Elevators
 Escalators
 Active CCTV surveillance

References

External links

Turin Metro stations
Railway stations opened in 2006
2006 establishments in Italy
Collegno
Railway stations in Italy opened in the 21st century